The 2011–12 season of Olympique Lyonnais was the club's 53rd season in Ligue 1. After a third-place finish last season, the club played in the UEFA Champions League for the 12th consecutive season.

News
At the end of the 2010–11 season, fans had become dissatisfied with then manager Claude Puel, despite the club managing to finish in third place, synonymous with qualification to the UEFA Champions League Play-off round. However, due to poor results and a falling out with the club's hierarchy, he was sacked. He was replaced by former technical coach Rémi Garde, who announced his intentions to compete for the league title.

On 17 June, Lyon announced the departure of midfielder Jérémy Toulalan to Málaga for €10 million.

During pre-season training, Yoann Gourcuff suffered another injury blow, this time to his left ankle, which required an operation keeping him out for at least a month.

On 16 July, Brazilian midfielder Ederson was injured to the right knee during a pre-season match against Racing Genk after a collision with teammate Dejan Lovren.

On 12 August Lyon announce the signing of Burkina Faso international defender Bakary Koné from Guingamp for €2 million.

On 27 August, during a match against Montpellier, forward Lisandro López injured his ankle. It was originally feared that he had broken his ankle, as the striker believed he had heard a crack, but scans later allayed these fears. Nevertheless, the Argentine will be out for several weeks.

On 30 August Lyon signed defender Mouhamadou Dabo from Sevilla for a modest €1 million that could rise to €1.8 million if certain playing criteria are met.

On summer transfer deadline day, Lyon announced the sale of Bosnian international midfielder Miralem Pjanić to Roma for €11 million, and the arrival of midfielder Gueïda Fofana from Le Havre for €1.8 million, possibly rising to €2.6 million.

On 28 September, the club announced that Michel Bastos had signed a two-year contract extension keeping him at the club until 2015.

On 30 March, the club issued a press release confirming that forward Alexandre Lacazette had signed a contract extension until 2016, and that defender Samuel Umtiti had signed his first professional contract at the club. The latter deal comes after the young central defender's successful promotion into the club's first team in recent months.

Transfers

Summer in

Total spending:  €4.8 million

Summer out

Total income:  €21 million

Winter in

Winter out

Squad information

Club

Coaching staff

Other information

Pre-season

Competitions

Ligue 1

League table

Results summary

Results by round

Matches

Last updated: 20 May 2012 Source: Ligue 1

Coupe de France

Coupe de la Ligue

UEFA Champions League

Play-off round

Group D

Knockout phase

Round of 16

Squad statistics

Appearances and goals
Last updated on 5 June 2012.

|-
|colspan="14"|Players sold/loaned after the start of the season:

|}

References

Olympique Lyonnais seasons
Lyon
Lyon